Monica Desai was an Indian actress. She was married to Phani Majumdar.

Filmography

 Vikram Shashikala (1948)
 Ajit (1948)
 Chanda Ki Chandni (1948)
 Chittor Vijay (1947)
 Devdasi (1945)
 Bhanwara
 Gauri (1943)
 Chitralekha (1941)
 Nimai Sanyasi (1940)

References

External links

Indian film actresses
Actresses in Hindi cinema
Possibly living people
Year of birth missing
Place of birth missing